The New Zealand Film Archive was established in 1981.  On 1 August 2014 the archive was amalgamated with Sound Archives Ngā Taonga Kōrero and the Television New Zealand Archive to form Ngā Taonga Sound & Vision.

2009 lost film recovery

In early 2009, a collection of 75 previously thought to be lost American silent films, were discovered in the New Zealand Film Archive. The films dated from 1898 to 1929 and were previously thought to be lost films.

Background and restoration

During the time period that the films were performed films were shipped to countries along a "distribution line" format, with New Zealand often being the last place the films would be shipped. Because of the high cost of transport during this time and the flammability of the early film stock, most of the films would not be shipped back to the United States and were moved into government archives, were destroyed, or given or sold to private owners.

The films were discovered during a visit to the archive by Brian Meacham, a Los Angeles film preservationist. Meacham was curious as to what films the archive held, upon which it was discovered that the archive held a large number of early American films. The New Zealand Film Archive's Steve Russell said "It's one of the rare cases where the tyranny of distance has worked in our and the films' favour". In 2009, the archive agreed with the (American) National Film Preservation Foundation to repatriate 75 silent American films, all rare or previously thought by American archivists and scholars to be lost (the archive continues to hold many other silent-era American films). About 70 percent of the copies were complete.

In order to export the films back to the United States, the movies had to be transported in U.N.-approved steel barrels in incremental shipments. Many of the films had begun to deteriorate, with NFPF director Annette Melville saying "About a quarter of the films are in advanced nitrate decay and the rest have good image quality, though they are badly shrunken". The repatriated films from this discovery were sent for preservation and storage to five major film archives in the United States:  the Library of Congress, the Academy Film Archive, the George Eastman House, the UCLA Film and Television Archive, and the Museum of Modern Art.  Those films sent to the Academy Film Archive now form that institution's New Zealand Collection.

Films discovered

Of the 75 films discovered in the New Zealand archive, some of the more notable examples were John Ford's 1927 film Upstream and the 1923 film Maytime. It was also noted by the New York Times that many of the films that were recovered "underline the major contribution made by women to early cinema". Sony has assumed the costs for the restoration of Mary of the Movies.

The Hitchcock film The White Shadow was discovered in the collection, mislabeled as the movie Twin Sisters and lacked a title credit. The discovery of this film was named as one of Movies.com's "Biggest Surprises of 2011".

See also 
 Cinema of New Zealand
 List of New Zealand films
 National Film Library, New Zealand

References

Film archives in New Zealand
Film organisations in New Zealand